@midnight is an American comedy panel show hosted by Chris Hardwick. The half-hour show premiered on October 21, 2013, and airs Mondays through Thursdays on Comedy Central. A total of 600 episodes have aired. After the cancellation of The Nightly Show with Larry Wilmore, it was moved to 11:30 p.m. (EST), where it continued to air through its final episode, which aired on August 4, 2017.

Seasons

Episodes

2013–14

2015

2016

2017

References

External links
 
 

@Midnight